Watermelon, Chicken & Gritz is the commercial debut studio album by American hip hop sextet Nappy Roots from Kentucky. It was released on February 26, 2002 via Atlantic Records.

Background
Recording sessions took place at Tree Sound and PatchWerk Recording Studios in Atlanta, at Soundstage Studios in Nashville, at Rusk, Larrabee West & North and Image Recording Studios in Los Angeles, and at Signature Sound in San Diego. Production was handled mostly by James "Groove" Chambers, along with the Trackboyz, Mike Caren, Mike City, Brian Kidd, Carlos Broady and Troy Johnson. It features guest appearances from Anthony Hamilton, The Bar-Kays, Jazze Pha, Ayesha Kirk, CJ "Voodou" Henry and Tiffany Villarreal.

Reception
The album peaked at number 24 on the Billboard 200 and at number 3 on the Top R&B/Hip-Hop Albums chart in the United States. It was certified gold by the Recording Industry Association of America on April 16, 2002 and later reached platinum certification on October 10, 2002.

The album was preceded by a promotional single "Set It Out"/"Hustla" and its lead single "Awnaw", both released in 2001. "Awnaw", featuring vocals from Jazze Pha, made it to #51 on the Billboard Hot 100 singles chart. The second single from the album was "Po' Folks" featuring Anthony Hamilton, which also reached Billboard Hot 100 at peak position #21. The albums' third single, "Headz Up", charted at #88 on the Hot R&B/Hip-Hop Songs and at #39 on the Rhythmic Songs.

Track listing
Credits adapted from the album's liner notes.

Sample Credits
 "Ho Down" contains an interpolation of "Delgado", written by Edward Harris.

Charts

Weekly charts

Year-end charts

Certifications

References

External links

2002 albums
Nappy Roots albums
Atlantic Records albums
Albums produced by Mike City